Abbasabad (also Romanized as ‘Abbāsābād) is a village in Rostaq Rural District, in the Central District of Khomeyn County, Markazi Province, Iran. At the 2006 census, its population was 58, in 15 families.

References 

Populated places in Khomeyn County